Jemappes (in older texts also: Jemmapes) is a town of Wallonia and a district of the municipality of Mons, located in the province of Hainaut, Belgium.

It was a municipality until the fusion of the Belgian municipalities in 1973.

Jemappes is known for the Battle of Jemappes between the French and Austrian armies in 1792.

During the French occupation of Belgium (1792–1814), there was a département named after the Battle of Jemappes, Jemmape. 
Jemappes was also a battleground in the First World War.

Notable inhabitants

 Georges Emile Lebacq, painter born on 26 September 1876
 Jean-Marie Buchet, author-filmmaker born on 24 February 1938.
 Salvatore Adamo, singer, lived here 1948 - ?
 Gérard Roland, noted Economist, born in 1954.

Gallery

Sub-municipalities of Mons
Former municipalities of Hainaut (province)
Belgium geography articles needing translation from French Wikipedia